Omicron Aquarii, Latinized from ο Aquarii, is the Bayer designation for a variable star in the equatorial constellation of Aquarius. Visible to the naked eye, it has an apparent visual magnitude of +4.71. It is drifting further away with a radial velocity of +11 km/s. The star is a candidate member of the Pisces-Eridanus stellar stream.

It has the traditional star name Kae Uh, from the Chinese  (Mandarin pronunciation ). In Chinese astronomy,  is the rooftop, an asterism consisting of ο Aquarii and 32 Aquarii.

The spectrum of Omicron Aquarii fits a stellar classification of B7 IVe; the luminosity class of IV suggests that this is a subgiant star that is exhausting the supply of hydrogen at its core and is in the process of evolving into a giant star. The 'e' suffix on the class indicates that the spectrum shows emission lines of hydrogen, thus categorizing this as a Be star. It is rotating rapidly with an equatorial rotational velocity of 368 km/s, which is ∼96% of the star's critical rotation velocity of 391 km/s. The emission lines are being generated by a  circumstellar disk of hot hydrogen gas. This disk has been globally stable for at least twenty years, as of 2020. It is likely a single star, with no stellar companions.

Omicron Aquarii has 4.2 times the mass of the Sun, four times the Sun's radius, and is radiating 340 times the luminosity of the Sun from its photosphere at an effective temperature of 13,464 K. It is classified as a Gamma Cassiopeiae type variable star and its brightness varies from magnitude +4.68 down to +4.89.

References

External links
 Image Omicron Aquarii

B-type subgiants
Emission-line stars
Gamma Cassiopeiae variable stars

Aquarius (constellation)
Aquarii, Omicron
BD-02 5681
Aquarii, 031
209409
108874
8402
Kae Uh